Mack Boatner (born October 4, 1958) is a former American football running back. He played for the Tampa Bay Buccaneers in 1986.

References

1958 births
Living people
American football running backs
Southeastern Louisiana Lions football players
Chicago Blitz players
Arizona Wranglers players
Arizona Outlaws players
Tampa Bay Buccaneers players